Bolivia is a country with great tourism potential, with many attractions, due to its diverse culture, geographic regions, rich history and food. In particular, the salt flats at Uyuni are a major attraction.

Visitor statistics
Most visitors arriving to Bolivia were from the following countries of nationality:

World Heritage Site 
In the country there are six World Heritages declared by the UNESCO:
 The ruins of the city of Tiwanaku, capital of the 6th-century empire that ruled the southern Andes
 The city of Potosí, historic city known for its religious and civic monuments and Cerro Rico
 The Amazon, a large rainforest and sanctuary for wildlife.
 Noel Kempff Mercado National Park, representative place of the Amazon and its immense biodiversity, located on a large plateau, covered by vast forests and magnificent waterfalls.
 Madidi National Park, the most diverse place in Bolivia, declared by National Geographic to be one of the 20 best places to visit in the world.
 Toro Toro National Park, where found paleontological wealth (thousands of dinosaurs footprints), caves, waterfalls, rock paintings and other places of interest are.
 The Jesuit Missions of Chiquitos, the only active missions of all of South America.
 The Fort Samaipata, the big rock carved by the Incas in the foothills of the Andes as the limit of his empire.
 The Carnival of Oruro,a festival in which Catholicism is mixed with paganism.

Destination 

Lake Titicaca, the world's highest navigable lake.
 The Isla del Sol, the sacred place of the Incas and birthplace of the founders of the Inca Empire, Manco Cápac and Mama Ocllo
 The Isla de la Luna, another sacred place of the Incas near the Isla del Sol.
 Copacabana, a small town on the shores of Titicaca, home to the Virgin of Copacabana, crowned queen of Bolivia.

 The Andes, the longest mountain range in the world, spanning the entire continent, and has exceptionally attractive regions:
 The ski slope containing the highest restaurant in the world, called Chacaltaya.
 The highest mountain in the country: Nevado Sajama, with the highest forest in the world.
 The salt flats of Uyuni and Coipasa, the largest salt flats in the world.
 Bolivia also is the only country in the world in having the only hotel totally fabricated of salt, found in the Uyuni.
 The lakes Green lake and Red Lagoon, the sanctuary of the Andean flamingos with one of the largest active volcanoes in the world, the Licancabur.

 The historic cities of:
 Potosí with its Cerro Rico, formerly the largest deposit of silver in the world.
 Sucre, the constitutional capital city of Bolivia, and The City of Four Names, which is home to one of the oldest universities in the Americas.
 Cal Orcko is a paleontological site, found in the quarry of a cement factory, in the Department of Chuquisaca.
 Casa de la Libertad, where the Declaration of Independence of Bolivia remains.
 La Recoleta, a Franciscan monastery, one of the first in the city.
 The Madidi National Park, considered by National Geographic to be one of the most imprescidible places to visit in the world, is part of the circuit of tourism in Bolivia.
 The Noel Kempff Mercado National Park, located in the department of SantHeritage, which was on 13 December 1991 declared a World Heritage Site. The camps Flor de Oro (the principal camp) and Los Fierros have tourist infrastructure.

See also
 Visa policy of Bolivia
 List of national parks of Bolivia
 Visitor attractions in Bolivia (category)
 Aquicuana Reserve
 Lake Titicaca
 Uyuni

References

External links 

 Tourism in Bolivia
 

 
Bolivia